The Legend of Hei (罗小黑战记大电影) is an animated film prequel to the animated series, The Legend of Luo Xiaohei, released in summer 2019. The movie details various events in the life of Luo Xiaohei which take place before the show.

Synopsis

Xiaohei begins his wandering journey because his home is destroyed by humans. On a search for a new home, he encounters other monsters as well as human allies, some of which share his dislike of humans. This leaves him with the dilemma of which side to choose.

Releases
The Legend of Hei was released September 2019 in China. It was released in the USA and Canada by Shout! Studio.

See also
The Legend of Luo Xiaohei

References 

Chinese animated films
Animated feature films
2019 films